Umbria is a region of modern Italy.

Umbria may also mean:

 Roman Umbria, the region of ancient Roman Italy
 RMS Umbria, a British ship (1884-1910)
 SS Umbria, an Italian ship (1910-1940)
 Eccellenza Umbria, a football team
 Naarda umbria, a moth species
 Punta Umbría, a municipality in Spain
 Umbri, an ancient Italic people
 Lucin, Utah, also known as Umbria Junction